Momišići is a suburb of Podgorica, Montenegro.

See also
List of Podgorica neighbourhoods and suburbs#Momišići

References

Suburbs of Podgorica